Richard Scragg (born 5 April 1978) is a New Zealand former cricketer. He played first-class cricket for Auckland and Central Districts between 1996 and 2002.

See also
 List of Auckland representative cricketers

References

External links
 

1978 births
Living people
New Zealand cricketers
Auckland cricketers
Central Districts cricketers
Cricketers from Auckland